Phangyul Gewog (Dzongkha: ཕངས་ཡུལ་) is a gewog (village block) of Wangdue Phodrang District, Bhutan.

References

Gewogs of Bhutan
Wangdue Phodrang District